YSA may refer to:

 Young Scientists of Australia, an organization dedicated to the promotion of science in Australia
 Young Single Adult, a designation in The Church of Jesus Christ of Latter-day Saints for unmarried people between the ages of 18 and 30, see Single adult (LDS Church)
 Youth Service America, a U.S. organization promoting increased opportunities for youth voice and service learning
 Young Socialist Alliance, the youth organization of the U.S. Socialist Workers Party